The Jacquet Flyer was an American automobile manufactured in Belding, Michigan in 1921.

History 
Built by the Jacquet Motor Corporation of America, the Jacquet Flyer was a sports car which was priced at $4,000 . The Flyer had a  wheelbase and wire wheels were standard.  The Flyer, only one of which were made, were powered by four-cylinder Wisconsin engines of 6.2L capacity; the only model offered was a two-passenger roadster.

References

Defunct motor vehicle manufacturers of the United States
Motor vehicle manufacturers based in Michigan
Defunct companies based in Michigan
Vintage vehicles
1920s cars
Cars introduced in 1921
Vehicle manufacturing companies established in 1921
Vehicle manufacturing companies disestablished in 1922